A works team (sometimes factory team, company team) is a sports team that is financed and run by a manufacturer or other business. Sometimes, works teams contain or are entirely made up of employees of the supporting company.

Association football

Africa
A number of works teams were founded in the former Portuguese territory of Mozambique that still are currently major teams in that Portuguese-speaking African country (independent since 1975). Grupo Desportivo da Companhia Têxtil do Punguè and Textáfrica do Chimoio are examples of two works teams which were the teams of two textile companies. In addition, two major teams of the railway network also achieved notoriety – the Clube Ferroviário de Maputo and the Clube Ferroviário da Beira.

Other former and current works teams in Africa include Arab Contractors SC of Egypt (also a sporting club) and AS Police (Benin). Horseed FC is based in Horseed, Somalia. A seven-time champion of the Somalia League, it is a former army team. Other works teams that have played in the Somali football leagues include Banaadir Telecom, Ports Authority, and Somali Police.

Asia
Works teams are common in Japan, with several J.League clubs starting life as a member of the amateur Japan Soccer League (e.g., Yokohama F. Marinos, who were originally Nissan F.C.). Modern examples include Honda F.C., Mitsubishi Motors Mizushima, Sony Sendai and Maruyasu Okazaki. The highest league Japanese works teams can compete in is the Japan Football League, the de facto national fourth division; the J. League specifically bars works teams from its ranks unless they professionalise and adopt the community they play in as a source of fan support.

Current and former works teams in South Korea include Busan Transportation Corporation FC, Gyeongju Korea Hydro & Nuclear Power FC, Ulsan Hyundai Mipo Dolphin FC, and Hanil Bank FC.

In Iran current and former work teams are the Zob Ahan Esfahan F.C. is the steel factory team in Isfahan. The Sepahan S.C. is owned by Mobarake Steel company. And there are many other teams in Iran that are factory and workers teams including, Aluminium Arak F.C., Paykan F.C., Foolad F.C., Sanat Naft Abadan F.C., F.C. Nassaji Mazandaran, Gol Gohar Sirjan F.C.

Other current and former Asian works teams include Tatung F.C., a Taiwanese professional football club based in Taipei, affiliated with the Tatung electronics company, Nepal Police Club, Thai Farmers Bank F.C., Krung Thai Bank F.C., Viettel F.C. (formerly The Cong, or the football team of the Vietnam People's Army), Oil India FC, United City FC (formerly the works team of Vallacar Transit Inc.) and ASEB SC.

Europe

European former works teams include those of PSV Eindhoven (Philips), FC Sochaux-Montbéliard (Peugeot), Bayer Leverkusen (Bayer), VfL Wolfsburg (Volkswagen), Evian Thonon Gaillard F.C. (Groupe Danone), and FC Carl Zeiss Jena (Carl Zeiss).

In the Soviet Union there were officially no professional footballers as everyone supposedly lived in the country of working people. So the Soviet footballers were officially on the books of big Soviet industrial giants or state agencies and were officially paid by those employers as their workers even though never performing functions for what they were paid.

The oldest football club in Spain is Recreativo de Huelva, formed on 23 December 1889 by Dr. William Alexander Mackay and British workers employed by the Rio Tinto Company. Sevilla FC, started as a team made up of workers from the Seville Water Works, while Atlético Madrid was, from 1939 to 1947, called Athletic Aviación de Madrid, having merged with Aviación Nacional of Zaragoza, founded in 1939 by members of the Spanish Air Force.

The Portuguese conglomerate Companhia União Fabril (CUF) had also its own sports club, founded as a true works team in 1937. It was located in the Lisbon's industrial suburb of Barreiro, and was called Grupo Desportivo da CUF. The club, which was a major contender in the main Portuguese Football Championship, was disbanded and replaced by G.D. Fabril due to a military coup in 1974.

Several professional football clubs in the United Kingdom were also formed as works teams, including Manchester United (the team of the Lancashire and Yorkshire Railway depot at Newton Heath), Arsenal (formed as Dial Square in 1886 by workers at the Royal Arsenal in Woolwich), West Ham United (formerly Thames Ironworks), Coventry City, founded by workers of the Singer bicycle company, and the Scottish team Livingston (formerly Ferranti Thistle).

A few amateur and semi-professional United Kingdom association football (soccer) works teams retain their companies' names, including Airbus UK, Cammell Laird, and Vauxhall Motors. Other former and current amateur and semi-professional UK works teams include Crawley Down Gatwick F.C., Civil Service F.C., Harrogate Railway Athletic F.C., United Services Portsmouth F.C., Metropolitan Police F.C., Stewarts & Lloyds Corby A.F.C., Royal Engineers A.F.C., Atherton Collieries A.F.C., Prescot Cables F.C., Stocksbridge Park Steels F.C., and Cardiff Civil Service. Bath City Football Club from Somerset, England, was formed in 1889 as Bath A.F.C. The team changed its name to Bath Railway in 1902, before settling on the name Bath City F.C. Included among Scottish amateur works teams are Inverurie Loco Works F.C., Colville Park A.F.C. (Ravenscraig steelworks), Shawfield Amateurs (White's Chemical Works) and Burntisland Shipyard A.F.C., while Glynhill Moorcroft A.F.C. began as Babcock & Wilcox F.C., the works team of the Renfrew engineering company.

In the League of Ireland a number of early clubs, including St James's Gate F.C., Fordsons, Jacobs, Midland Athletic and Dundalk all had their origins as a factory or works team. In Northern Ireland, Linfield F.C. was founded in Sandy Row in March 1886 by workers from the Ulster Spinning Company's Linfield Mill. Originally named the Linfield Athletic Club, its playing ground, "the Meadow", was situated behind the mill. Lisburn Distillery F.C. was created as by employees of Dunville's Royal Irish Distillery in Grosvenor Street, Belfast in July 1879.

The name of the football club Videoton FC (Hungary) comes from a Hungarian contract electronics manufacturer. The club, founded in 1941 by the defence manufacturing company Székesfehérvári Vadásztölténygyár, was made up of workers of the local factory in its early years.

Fotbal Club CFR 1907 Cluj was founded in 1907, when the city of Cluj-Napoca was part of Austro-Hungarian Empire, under the name Cluj Railway Sports Club (Kolozsvári Vasutas Sport Club). From 1907 to 1910, the team played in the municipal championship.

Fudbalski klub Željezničar (English: Football Club Željezničar) is a Bosnian professional football club based in Sarajevo, Bosnia and Herzegovina. The name Željezničar means "railway worker", given because it was established by a group of railway workers.

More clubs in former Yugoslavia were formed by Yugoslav Railways employees, for instance, Serbian club ŽAK Subotica (Železničarski atletski klub Subotica, translation Railways athletic club Subotica) was a club formed and backed throughout its existence by the railways company. It was dissolved in 1945.  In its place the new socialist authorities which replaced the monarchy in Yugoslavia formed FK Spartak Subotica which kept tight links with the railways company. Željezničar Sarajevo, ŽAK Subotica and Spartak Subotica are the railways-backed clubs with best performances in the league, but besides these there were many others such as ŽAK Kikinda, Železničar Belgrade, Železničar Smederevo, Železničar Lajkovac, Železničar Niš, in Serbia, and Željezničar Doboj in Bosnia.  In other parts of Yugoslavia there are other cases, in North Macedonia, FK Rabotnički became owned in 1949 by the labour union of the railways company. The link between the club and the railways was kept ever since with their followers even nowadays are known as Železničari and the railways simbol is part of club's logo. In Slovenia the railways had one club in each one of the two main Slovenian cites, NK Železničar Maribor and NK Železničar Ljubljana.  In relation with railways, Serbian club GFK Jasenica 1911 became known during the 1970s, 1980s and 1990s as FK Mladost GOŠA because at that period the club was backed by the GOŠA, a former train wagons factory from Smederevska Palanka.

Other cases in Yugoslavia include HNK Borovo, which was formed in 1933 as SK BATA Borovo.  The club was formed as the promotional team for the Bata Shoes factory in Borovo and it was founded by the BATA company founder, Tomáš Baťa himself. The company had already earlier in 1922 became owner of the Czech club FC Zlín which was known between 1924 and 1948 as SK Bata Zlin.

The best well known success story of a company and football club connection in Yugoslavia was the one of FK Zemun.  Zemun, a city just in the outskirts of capital Belgrade, was known for many home-born notable players and some more or less successful football clubs ever since first half of the 1920s.  SK Sparta Zemun played in the Yugoslav First League still in the 1930s.  However, two decades after the end of the Second World War, the city had just a big number of small lower-leagues clubs.  At that time Zemun was also home of Galenika a.d., a leading pharmaceutical company in Yugoslavia and one of the major of all South-Eastern Europe.  The company owned a small club, FK Galenika, however by the late 1960s they decided to play a bigger role in football.  FK Jedinstvo Zemun was at time the leading club in the city. In 1962 they achieved promotion to the Yugoslav Second League but they managed to stay at that level just two seasons.  In 1969 they were playing third level, the Serbian Republic League, and were struggling financially.  It was then that Galenika decided to take over the club and by merging it with its own minor club they formed FK Galenika Zemun.  The company injected resources and backed the club financially, and the results immediately stated to show up. Right in the first season the club managed promotion back to the Yugoslav Second League where they will become among the strongest teams in the following decade. After several failed attempts Galenika Zemun achieved promotion to the Yugoslav First League in 1982 and that same year they reached the semi-finals of the Yugoslav Cup.  Playing in the Yugoslav top level, during the 1980s the club played side-by-side with the big ones such as Red Star, Partizan Belgrade, Hajduk Split or Dinamo Zagreb, and Yugoslav football fans all became well aware of the name FK Galenika Zemun.  Later, by the early 1990s the wars and the break-up of Yugoslavia started, Galenika suffered the financially asphyxiating consequences of the economic sanctions imposed to Serbia. The company had to drop its backing to the club and the club dropped the company name and became known just as FK Zemun.  They managed to survive for some time during the 1990s in the First League of FR Yugoslavia, however the results were being worse each year, and by the turn of the millennium FK Zemun was relegated to the lower-leagues with just few occasional but flashy and inconsistent comebacks. Easy to conclude how the presence of Galenika in the club was fundamental for them to archive results and stability and without them Zemun supporters can only remember nostalgically the period when the club had its golden era thanks to the perfect wedding with a major local pharmaceutical company.

One of those minor clubs that emerged in Zemun was SK Naša Krila Zemun (Naša Krila means Our Wings), which existed only for three years between 1947 and 1950, and was formed and owned by the Yugoslav Air Force. The club managed to archive impressive record for such a shot existence, making its presence in two seasons in the Yugoslav First League and reaching the Yugoslav Cup final in 1947 and 1949.  While the Yugoslav Air Force created its club in Serbia in Zemun, a suburb of the capital Belgrade, the Yugoslav Navy created their club in Croatia, in the major Yugoslav port, Split, and named it NK Mornar Split.  However, just as Naša Krila, the club lived shortly, it was formed in 1946 and disbanded two years later.

and by the 1960s a new club, which was formed by a merger of a number of smaller ones, was making its way to the highlights of Yugoslav football.

Serbian club FK Smederevo 1924 was founded as a local iron factory SARTID football team. The club will be known by the company name since its foundation, in 1924, until 1944 when it became nationalised.  In 1992 it will restore the name Sartid just as the club ownership returned to the Sartid metallurgical company and will remain till 2004, the year the company, by then now owned by U.S. Steel, left the direction of the club.

There are many other cases in Serbia, specially among medium-size clubs and their main local companies, such as FK Čukarički (known as Čukarički Stankom between 2001 and 2011 when it was owned by Stankom company), FK Hajduk Kula (known as FK Hajduk Rodić during the period it was backed by the Rodić company), FK Javor Ivanjica (known since summer 2014 as FK Javor Matis due to its backing from local Matis company), FK Sloboda Užice (known as FK Sloboda Point Sevojno after its merger with FK Sevojno in 2010 and backing from Point company), ČSK Čelarevo (also known as ČSK Pivara, owned and closely related throughout its history by beer manufacturer Pivara Čelarevo), FK Mladost Apatin (formed by the owner of a local clothing factory Tri Zvezde, it was named since its foundation in 1924 till 1950 as SK Tri Zvezde and during that time most of the players of the squad were also employees at the factory).

FC Sheriff Tiraspol is based in the capital of Transnistria, was founded by the Sheriff security company in 1997.

Most of the Ukrainian Premier League clubs in Ukraine trace their roots to factory teams among several there is FC Dnipro Dnipropetrovsk that was originally formed as factory team of Bryanka Factory (today Dnipropetrovsk Metallurgical Plant). FC Shakhtar Horlivka traces its roots to the Football Association of the Gorlovka Artillery Works (FOGAZ). In times of the Soviet Union until the 1960s in Kiev was a sports club of Kiev Arsenal factory, SC Arsenal Kiev, which fielded number of teams in various sports such as association football, hockey, others. In 2001 there was an attempt to revive the club by the Kiev city authorities (see FC Arsenal Kiev). FC Zirka Kropyvnytskyi was originally formed by the Elvorti Factory personnel and after the Communist revolution it was renamed along with the factory. FC Zorya Luhansk was formed at the October Revolution Locomotive Factory (today Luhanskteplovoz). FC Metalist Kharkiv was formed at the Kharkiv Locomotive Factory (today Malyshev Factory). There also was a factory team of the Donetsk Steel Works (see FC Metalurh Donetsk). At the KryvbasOre (today Kryvyi Rih Iron Ore Association) were created such teams like FC Hirnyk Kryvyi Rih and FC Kryvbas Kryvyi Rih. FC Metalurh Zaporizhia traces its roots to the team of Zaporizhstal. FC Torpedo Zaporizhia traces its roots to the team of ZAZ car factory.
From Romania we have Rapid Bucharest that it was founded in 1923 by a group workers of the Grivița workshops under the name of Asociația culturală și sportivă CFR ("CFR Cultural and Sports Association").

North America

Bethlehem Steel F.C., which holds a record number of U.S. Open Cup wins, was the factory team of the Bethlehem Steel Corporation in Pennsylvania.

One of the most popular teams in Mexico, Cruz Azul, is a works team owned by Cooperativa La Cruz Azul S.C.L., an industrial cement company. The team was formed on 22 May 1927 by some of the company's workers.

South America
Several Argentinian clubs began life as the works teams of British-owned railway companies, including Rosario Central, Talleres de Córdoba, Ferro Carril Oeste, Club Ferrocarril Midland and Club Atlético Central Córdoba. Club Deportivo Mandiyú, also referred as Mandiyú is an Argentine football club, based in Corrientes, in the Province of the same name. The club was founded under the name "Club Deportivo Tipoiti" on 14 December 1952, by a group of textile workers from the Tipoiti textile factory in Corrientes, Argentina. Because the Argentine Football Association did not accept commercial company names, the club had to change its name to "Club Deportivo Mandiyú", which means cotton in the indigenous language of Guaraní.

In Brazil, clubs that were born as works teams include São Paulo Railway (now Nacional), Cotonifício Rodolfo Crespi (now Juventus), Sport Club Corinthians Paulista (also a sporting club, formed by railway workers), and Bangu.

Uruguay has one of the best known clubs that began as a works team: Central Uruguay Railway Cricket Club, or just CURCC, which was the basis for the later foundation of Peñarol, one of the top two clubs in that country.

Arguably, Club Universidad de Chile is a works team, having been formed by university students before becoming part of the university's brand until 1980. (A number of university teams around the world play professionally, including University of Pretoria F.C. in South Africa; FC Academia Chișinău in Moldova; Cardiff Metropolitan University F.C. in Wales (once called Inter CableTel A.F.C.); and Club Universidad de Guadalajara in Mexico.)

In Ecuador, a perfect example of a works team is CS Emelec, which was founded by the Empresa Eléctrica del Ecuador, Guayaquil's first electric company. For several decades, Emelec's players and directors were employees in the company, though such involvement decreased gradually until the company eventually folded in the 2000s (decade), the club being de facto autonomous for decades before.

Sociedad Deportiva Aucas is another important works team in Ecuador. Historically the most popular team in Quito, Aucas was founded and initially integrated and financed by employees of Royal Dutch Shell. They named the club after the Huaorani tribes that they encountered while prospecting for oil in the Ecuadorian Amazonian jungles.

Club Alianza Lima was founded as Sport Alianza in 1901 by workers in the Alianza Racing Horse Stud, then property of two-time President of Peru Augusto B. Leguía.

Rugby union
In rugby union, too has a works team tradition going back many decades, although the clubs have declined post professionalism in heartland countries, it has not been completely extinguished. As late as 1988 the Wales Captain played his club rugby for South Wales Police. As of 2017, Tata Steel play in the Second Flight of the WRU Club Pyramid. The British Army still plays occasional matches against Clubs, and has won the Middlesex Sevens in the 2000s.

Currently the strongest works teams are in Asia. The Top League in Japan features teams such as Suntory Sungoliath, Toyota Verblitz and IBM Big Blue. Samsung has a team in the Korean league.

American football 
Works teams were common in the early days of professional football. The Columbus Panhandles were a famous works team; it consisted of Pennsylvania Railroad employees, including the famed Nesser Brothers, and eventually became a charter member of the National Football League.

The National Public Safety Football League is a modern-day example of a league of works teams, with each team in the league consisting of employees of a public department (usually police or fire) in a given city.

The Green Bay Packers obtained its name through company sponsorship from a meat packing company named the Indian Packing Company and its employee and team founder, Curly Lambeau.

The Chicago Bears was established by the A. E. Staley food starch company of Decatur, Illinois, as a company team under the name 'Decatur Staleys'. Today, A.E. Staley is an American subsidiary of Tate & Lyle PLC, a British company that produces a range of starch products for the food, paper and other industries, high-fructose corn syrup, crystalline fructose, and other agro-industrial products.

See also

 Sports club

References

Terminology used in multiple sports
Association football terminology
Basketball terminology
Cricket terminology
Rugby league terminology
Rugby union terminology
Motorsport terminology

Sports culture
Sports teams
Sports terminology